This is a list of dams and reservoirs in Romania.

References

Romania

Dams
Dams
Reservoirs in Romania